Erik Ruus (until 1986 Erik Molodov, pseudonym Erik Moldov; born on 23 April 1962 in Elva) is an Estonian actor.

In 1982 he graduated from Viljandi Culture Academy. Between 1985 and 1995 and 1996 and 2009, he was an actor at the Rakvere Theatre. From 1995 and 1996, he was an actor at the Endla Theatre in Pärnu. Since 2009, he has been a freelance actor. Besides stage roles he has also acted on films and television series.

Filmography

 1987: Vaatleja 
 1991: Ainus pühapäev
 1995: Tulivesi
 1997: Minu Leninid
 2002: Ferdinand
 2005: Stiilipidu
 2006: Ohtlik lend 
 2009: Päeva lõpus 	
 2010: Kutsar koputab kolm korda 
 2019: Johannes Pääsukese tõeline elu

References

Living people
1962 births
Estonian male stage actors
Estonian male film actors
Estonian male television actors
20th-century Estonian male actors
21st-century Estonian male actors
People from Elva, Estonia